Marinobacter pelagius is a Gram-negative, aerobic, moderately halophilic and neutrophilic bacterium from the genus of Marinobacter which has been isolated from seawater around Zhoushan in China. Marinobacter pelagius can be used to produce gold nanoparticles.

References

External links
Type strain of Marinobacter pelagius at BacDive -  the Bacterial Diversity Metadatabase

Further reading 
 
 
 

Alteromonadales
Bacteria described in 2008
Halophiles